Turritella terebra is a species of sea snail, a marine gastropod mollusk in the family Turritellidae.

Description

The shell of Turritella terebra, has a long tower-like shape which resembles a drill, hence its name. The shall is narrow and tall, with as many as 30 whorls. The shell is about 14 centimeters long. Its color is light to dark brown. The opening is circular.

Distribution
The species is native to the Indo-West Pacific region.

References

Turritellidae
Gastropods described in 1758
Taxa named by Carl Linnaeus